Jessica Laura Sutton (born June 2, 1993) is a South African actress. She is best known as Tally Craven from the Freeform series Motherland: Fort Salem and Mia in The Kissing Booth. Early life and education 
Sutton was born in Cape Town, South Africa.  Her primary school years were spent at Sweet Valley Primary School in Cape Town. She attended Act Cape Town (ACT) Film Academy and received her diploma in 2014 in Advanced Acting for Film and continues her studies with Matthew Harrison at The Actors Foundry in Vancouver.

 Career 
Since her start on screen in 2015, Jessica has appeared in several television shows, including Saints & Strangers,  Ice, American Monster and Motherland: Fort Salem. Her most recent film, Rogue, stars Megan Fox and was released in 2020. She also appeared in the films Detour, Finders Keepers, Bhai's Cafe, Escape Room, The Kissing Booth and Inside Man: Most Wanted.''

Filmography

Film

Television

Theater

References

External links 
 
 

Actresses from Cape Town
Living people
1993 births
South African film actresses
South African television actresses
21st-century South African actresses